Strike is a surname. Notable people with the surname include:

Alice Strike (1896–2004), last surviving female Canadian military World War I veteran
Anne Wafula Strike (born 1969), British wheelchair racer
Cormoran Strike, a fictional detective in the novels of 'Robert Galbraith' (J. K. Rowling)
Fred Strike (1880–1967), Canadian ice hockey player
Hilda Strike (1910–1989), Canadian track athlete
John Strike, baseball player 
Johnny Strike (1948–2018), American writer
Sam Strike (born 1994), English actor
Sheila Strike (born 1954), Canadian basketball player
Sylvaine Strike, South African actress, writer and theatre director
Tod Strike, Australian actor